Héctor René Lavandera (24 September 1928 – 7 February 2015), known as René Lavand, was an Argentine magician, specialising in close-up magic. He was notable for performing card tricks with only one hand.

Biography
Lavand was born in Buenos Aires in 1928. After losing a hand at the age of nine in a car crash, Lavand slowly taught himself card manipulation, later stating, "I went through hard times, but I got an advantage, I couldn't copy anyone's techniques." After working as a cashier in a bank, at the age of 32 he appeared in Buenos Aires' Tabarís Theater, following which his career took off, leading to world tours.

In the United States, Lavand appeared on Ed Sullivan's and Johnny Carson's television shows and performed in shows at the Magic Castle in Hollywood. The catchphrase he used for one of his most celebrated tricks was "No se puede hacer más lento" (Spanish for "it cannot be done any slower"), referencing the measured and slow pace of his performances.

In between international tours he resided in Tandil, Argentina, and adapted a railway carriage into a magic saloon where he taught the art of illusion. He also co-wrote (with Richard J. Kaufman) the book Mysteries of My Life. The book is an autobiography as well as an instructional book on his magic. He received several honors from the Academy of Magical Arts: Close-up Magician of the Year (1993), Performing Fellowship (1997), and Masters Fellowship (2011).

Lavand died of pneumonia at Nueva Clínica Chacabuco in Buenos Aires in 2015, aged 86.

Selected filmography
 Un oso rojo ("A Red Bear"), directed by Adrian Caetano (2002): plays 'El Turco'
 El Gran Simulador ("The Great Pretender"), directed by Néstor Frenkel (2013): biographical film with performance excerpts and interviews with Lavand at his home

Books 
 René Lavand: Slow motion magic I (1988)
 René Lavand: Slow motion magic II (1991)
 René Lavand: Magic from the Soul (1993)
 Mysteries of My Life (1998), with Richard Kaufman

References

Further reading
  Originally published in August 2014.

External links
René Lavand's It Can't Be Done Any Slower Video via YouTube

1928 births
2015 deaths
People from Buenos Aires
People from Tandil
Argentine magicians
Deaths from pneumonia in Argentina
Academy of Magical Arts Close-Up Magician of the Year winners
Academy of Magical Arts Masters Fellowship winners
Academy of Magical Arts Performing Fellowship winners